Čemernica   is a village in Croatia, in the municipality of Virovitica. It is connected by the D2 highway.

Populated places in Virovitica-Podravina County